William A. McAlmon (June 19, 1889 – January 4, 1917) was an American football player and coach.  He played college football as a halfback at the University of Minnesota from 1911 to 1913.  McAlmon Served as the head football coach at Grinnell College from 1915 to 1916, compiling a record of 13–2.  McAlmon died on January 4, 1917, in Minneapolis, Minnesota, after suffering from diabetes.

Head coaching record

References

External links
 

1889 births
1917 deaths
American football halfbacks
Grinnell Pioneers football coaches
Minnesota Golden Gophers football players
People from Dell Rapids, South Dakota
Players of American football from South Dakota
Deaths from diabetes